Ryazanskie Vedomosti is a regional socio-political daily newspaper, published in Ryazan by the Government of the Ryazan Region and the Ryazan Regional Duma; it has a circulation of 33,250 per week.

References

Literature
 Paul Hare, Gerard Turley: Handbook of the Economics and Political Economy of Transition. — Routledge, 2013. — p. 97. — .
 Vladimir Gelman, Vladimir Avdonin, Michael Brie, Sergei Ryzhenkov. Making and Breaking Democratic Transitions: The Comparative Politics of Russia's Regions. — Rowman & Littlefield, 2003. — pp. 185, 293. — .
 Рязанские ведомости // Рязанская энциклопедия: в 2 т. / гл. ред. В. Н. Федоткин. — Pressa, 2000. — Т. 2. Н-Я. — С. 292. — 719 с. — .
 Ryazanskie Vedomosti (ru) // Press for all: a handbook / ed. S. B. Dubinskaya. — Journalist-IRS, 2001. — 366 p.

1997 establishments in Russia
Newspapers established in 1997
Russian-language newspapers published in Russia